Westminster John Knox Press is an American publisher of Christian books located in Louisville, Kentucky and is part of Presbyterian Publishing Corporation, the publishing arm of the Louisville, Kentucky-based Presbyterian Church (U.S.A.). Their publishing focus is on books in "theology, biblical studies, preaching, worship, ethics, religion and culture, and other related fields for four main markets: scholars and students in colleges, universities, seminaries, and divinity schools; preachers, educators, and counselors working in churches; members of mainline Protestant congregations; and general readers. Geneva Press publishes books specifically related to the Presbyterian Church (U.S.A.)."

History
Westminster John Knox Press is the result of a merger in 1988 of the publishing companies Westminster Press and John Knox Press. It publishes scholarly works in religion and theology for the academic community, for congregations, and resources for teaching and ruling elders. It also publishes "nationally recognized trade books for general readers, and essential resources for ministry and the life of faith". It currently has over 1,600 books in print, and has been publishing books and other materials since 1838. In 2001, it had to reduce staff by 20%.

References

External links

Christian publishing companies
Book publishing companies of the United States
Presbyterian Church (USA)
Publishing companies established in 1838
Companies based in Louisville, Kentucky
American companies established in 1838